Haumai (Punjabi: ਹਉਮੈ) is the concept of self-centeredness (egoism or Ahankar) in Sikhism. This concept was taught by Guru Nanak, the founder of Sikhism, as the source of five evils: lust, covetousness, wrath, pride and attachment. According to Sikh Gurus teachings, it is Haumai that leads to endless cycles of transmigration (rebirth), and makes a person "manmukh". They state that one must turn away from Haumai, become a "gurmukh" and follow the path of the Guru to receive God's grace.

In Sikhism, the Haumai can only be overcome through meditation on God’s name (Naam), Simran and Sewa. It is a combination of the words Hau (ਹਉ) meaning "I" and Mai (ਮੈ) meaning "me".

The opposite of Haumai is humility (or Nimrata), which is considered a virtue in Sikhism. Selfless service called Seva, and complete submission to Waheguru, or God is the Sikh path to liberation.

Related concepts
The concept of destructive self-centeredness and covetous attachment, similar to Haumai in Sikhism, is important in other Indian religions. In Buddhism, Hinduism and Jainism, it is referred to as "Ahankar (अहङ्कार), Ahammana (अहम्मान),  Ahammati (अहम्मति), Mamatta (ममता) and Maminkāra''.

See also
 Sri Guru Granth Sahib

References

Sikh terminology
Sikh philosophical concepts